Make Your Wish is a 2014 South Korean drama television series starring Oh Ji-eun and Ki Tae-young. It aired on MBC from June 23, 2014 to January 2, 2015 on Mondays to Fridays at 19:15 for 120 episodes.

Plot
Han So-won struggles to prove the innocence of her husband, who is framed for embezzlement and ends up in a vegetative state after an accident.

Cast
Oh Ji-eun as Han So-won
Ki Tae-young as Kang Jin-hee
Yoo Ho-rin as Song Yi-hyun
Lee Go-eun as young Yi-hyun
Kim Mi-kyung as Lee Jung-sook
Song Yoo-jung as Han Da-won
Park Jae-jung as Jang Hyun-woo
Lee Deok-hee as Kim Choo-cha
Lee Jong-soo as Jang Gyun-woo
Cha Hwa-yeon as Shin Hye-ran
Yeon Joon-seok as Song Seok-hyun
Kim Young-ok as Chairman Choi
Im Ji-eun as Jo Myung-hee
Kim Byung-choon as Ji Sang-geun
Ahn Yong-joon as Kim Deok-kyu

Awards and nominations

International broadcast
 It aired in Vietnam on HTV2 from December 17, 2015.
 It aired in Singapore on Mediacorp Channel U from April 26, 2017.

References

External links
 
Make Your Wish at MBC Global Media

MBC TV television dramas
2014 South Korean television series debuts
Korean-language television shows
2015 South Korean television series endings
South Korean romance television series